ArcBest Corporation is an American holding company for truckload and less-than-truckload (LTL) freight, freight brokerage, household good moving, and transportation management companies. Historically, the company also owned furniture, banking, and other diverse subsidiaries. The company ranked fifteenth among for-hire carriers in the US for 2020 according to industry journal Transport Topics.

History 

The company was formed in 1966 as Arkansas Best Corporation by Robert A. Young, owner of LTL carrier Arkansas-Best Freight System (now ABF Freight System), to be that carrier's holding company as a way to facilitate diversification. Young remained the company's chairman until his death in 1973. In the 1960s, the company acquired Healzer Cartage Company, Delta Motor Line and others.

Arkansas Best Corp. went public on the NYSE as "ABZ" in 1972. At the time, in addition to Arkansas-Best Freight System, it also owned Riverside Furniture Corporation, the National Bank of Commerce of Dallas, Texas, Data-Tronic Corporation, and Arkansas Bandag Corporation. In 1978, the company acquired Navajo Freight Lines. In 1988, the company was the subject of a hostile takeover which resulted in a leveraged buyout to take the company private. It went public again, this time on the Nasdaq, in 1992.

G.I. Trucking was subsequently sold in 2001 into joint ownership of a group of G.I. senior management and LTL carrier Estes Express Lines and was fully acquired by Estes in 2005. In 2013, it created ABF Logistics.

In 2014, Arkansas Best was renamed ArcBest Corporation. This was followed in 2015 by the acquisition of Smart Lines Transportation Group and Bear Transportation Services and in 2016 by the acquisition of Logistics & Distribution Services. Also in 2016, the company reorganized rebanding many of its services under the name ArcBest.

In 2021, ArcBest acquired MoLo Solutions, a truckload brokerage company based in Chicago. The deal was priced at  upfront and up to an additional  if MoLo hits certain revenue benchmarks by 2025. ArcBest intended to merge MoLo's operations and its existing brokerage operations onto a single platform.

Operations 

, ArcBest and its subsidiaries operated over 240 facilities in North America. The company ranked fifteenth on Transport Topics Top 100 For-Hire carriers list for 2020 with over 4,000 company-owned tractors, over 22,000 trailers, and 83 straight trucks in its fleet.

The company reports its revenue in two segments: asset-based (which consists of ABF Freight) and asset-light (all other operations).

Subsidiaries

ABF Freight 

ABF Logistics 

ABF Logistics provides brokerage and transportation management services.

ABF Moving/U-Pack

U-Pack is a household goods moving brand of ABF created in 1997. Since 2014, it has operated as a part of ABF Moving which itself is part of ABF Logistics.

Panther Premium Logistics 

Panther is a non-asset carrier based in Seville, Ohio, founded in 1992 which was acquired by ArcBest in 2012. At the time of acquisition, Panther Expedited Services was the second-largest US expedited carrier behind FedEx Custom Critical. The company was renamed Panther Premium Logistics in 2014.

FleetNet America 

FleetNet America provides repair and maintenance services. The company is based in Cherryville, North Carolina.

ArcBest Technologies 

Originally Data-Tronics Corp., the company was renamed ArcBest Technologies in 2014.

MoLo Solutions 

MoLo is a Chicago-based truckload freight brokerage company acquired by ArcBest in 2021.

References

External links 
 

Moving companies of the United States
Trucking companies of the United States
1923 establishments in Arkansas
Transportation companies based in Arkansas
Fort Smith, Arkansas